This article includes lists of border crossings, ordered from west to east (north to south for Alaska crossings), along the Canada–United States border. Each port of entry (POE) in the tables below links to an article about that crossing.

On the U.S. side, each crossing has a three-letter Port of Entry code. This code is also seen on  passport entry stamp or parole stamp. The list of codes is administered by the Department of State. Note that one code may correspond to multiple crossings.

Land ports of entry

Port of entry hours of service for road crossings, except where noted, are open year-round during the day.

Unstaffed road crossings
This is a list of roads that cross the U.S.-Canada border that do not have border inspection services, but where travelers are legally allowed to cross the border in one or both directions. 

In prior years, there were dozens of such roads where one could legally cross the border and then proceed to an open Customs office to report for inspection, but most have since been barricaded.  Current requirements for reporting to CBSA or CBP for inspection are noted.

Many former uncontrolled roads that served as points of entry along the U.S. Customs and Border Protection Swanton Sector were barricaded/closed in the mid-1970s in securing the 1976 Montreal Summer Olympics.

Rail crossings

Ferry crossings

This list is of point-to-point international ferry services, including those for road vehicles, passengers and rail. Other marine ports of entry are not included.

Closed land ports of entry

This list includes only those crossings known to have had customs or immigration services at the border, but are now inactive.  They are listed in order from west to east. Roads that are unattended, but otherwise still functioning are listed under the Unstaffed Road Crossings section.

See also

Canada Border Services Agency
U.S. Customs and Border Protection
Canada–United States border
American entry into Canada by land
Border town
List of Mexico–United States border crossings

Footnotes

References

External links
Canada Border Services Agency - Highway-Land Border Offices
U.S. Customs and Border Protection - Locate a Port of Entry